Knut Schubert (born 9 September 1958 in Bautzen, East Germany) is a former East German pair skater.  With his sister, Katja Schubert, he won the bronze medal at the 1974 East German Figure Skating Championships.  They went on to finish ninth at that year's European Figure Skating Championships and eleventh at the World Figure Skating Championships.

Schubert later teamed up with Birgit Lorenz.  They won the gold medal at the East German Championships in 1981 and 1985, and captured the silver medal in four additional years.  The couple won the bronze at the European Championships in 1983 and 1984 and finished fifth at the 1984 Winter Olympic Games.  They also finished a career-best sixth place at the 1984 World Championships.

After his figure skating career he studied teaching special subject sport. Knut Schubert became figure skating coach in Berlin. He trained Peggy Schwarz and Alexander König, Peggy Schwarz and Mirko Müller, Mariana Kautz and Norman Jeschke, Mikkeline Kierkgaard and Norman Jeschke and also Sarah Jentgens and Mirko Müller. In the early 1990s he also trained the ice dancers Kati Winkler and René Lohse. After he moved to Dortmund Knut Schubert trained local pairs of Rebecca Handke and Daniel Wende (till 2007), Ekaterina Vassilieva and Daniel Wende (till 2008) as well as Mari-Doris Vartmann and Florian Just (till 2009).

In 2010 he returned to Berlin and trains there Mari-Doris Vartmann and Aaron Van Cleave.

Knut Schubert is married and has two children. His daughter Pauline Schubert was also a figure skater.

Results

With Birgit Lorenz

With Katja Schubert

External links

Navigation 

1958 births
Living people
German male pair skaters
Figure skaters at the 1984 Winter Olympics
Olympic figure skaters of East Germany
European Figure Skating Championships medalists
People from Bautzen
Sportspeople from Saxony